Poachelas is a genus of African araneomorph spiders in the family Trachelidae, first described by C. R. Haddad & R. Lyle in 2008.

Species
 it contains four species:
Poachelas montanus Haddad & Lyle, 2008 – South Africa
Poachelas refugus Haddad, 2010 – South Africa
Poachelas solitarius Haddad & Lyle, 2008 – Zimbabwe
Poachelas striatus Haddad & Lyle, 2008 (type) – South Africa

References

Araneomorphae genera
Trachelidae